La Mézière (Gallo: La Maézierr) is a commune in the Ille-et-Vilaine department in Brittany in northwestern France.

Breton language
In 2008, 0.84% of primary-school children attended bilingual schools.

Population
Inhabitants of La Mézière are called Macériens in French.

See also
Communes of the Ille-et-Vilaine department

References

External links

Official website 
Mayors of Ille-et-Vilaine Association 

Communes of Ille-et-Vilaine